The 2008 Yale Bulldogs football team represented Yale University in the 2008 NCAA Division I FCS football season.  Tale averaged 11,070 fans per game. The Bulldogs were led by 12th-year head coach Jack Siedlecki, played their home games at the Yale Bowl and finished tied for first place in the Ivy League with a 4–3 record, 6–4 overall.

Schedule

References

Yale
Yale Bulldogs football seasons
Yale Bulldogs football